Fourth Avenue Methodist Episcopal Church, also known as Fourth Avenue United Methodist Church, is a historic church at 318 W. St. Catherine Street, at the corner of Fourth Avenue, in Louisville, Kentucky. It was added to the National Register of Historic Places in 1979.

It was deemed significant as "an exceptional example of Gothic Revival ecclesiastical architecture."  A part of the church was built in 1888, but the main facade and sanctuary were built during 1900–1902.

References

Churches on the National Register of Historic Places in Kentucky
Gothic Revival church buildings in Kentucky
Churches completed in 1890
19th-century Methodist church buildings in the United States
United Methodist churches in Kentucky
Churches in Louisville, Kentucky
National Register of Historic Places in Louisville, Kentucky
1890 establishments in Kentucky